Claudecir dos Reis Rodrigues Júnior (born 29 June 1989), commonly known as Claudecir, is a Brazilian footballer who plays as a forward.

Career statistics

Notes

Honours
Criciúma Esporte Clube
Campeonato Catarinense: 2013

Brasiliense
Copa Verde: 2014

Quảng Nam
V.League 1: 2017
Vietnamese Super Cup runner-up: 2018

Individuals
Best Foreign Player of the Year: 2017

References

1989 births
Living people
Brazilian expatriate footballers
Association football forwards
Clube Náutico Marcílio Dias players
Centro de Futebol Zico players
Artsul Futebol Clube players
Tanabi Esporte Clube players
Brasília Futebol Clube players
Brasiliense Futebol Clube players
Associação Desportiva Cabofriense players
Associação Atlética Anapolina players
Ceilândia Esporte Clube players
Quang Nam FC players
Campeonato Brasileiro Série C players
Campeonato Brasileiro Série D players
V.League 1 players
Brazilian expatriate sportspeople in Vietnam
Expatriate footballers in Vietnam
Footballers from Rio de Janeiro (city)
Brazilian footballers